Ismail (Ismaeel) Abdullatif Ismail Hassan, also spelled Abdullatif (born September 11, 1986), is a Bahraini professional football forward, currently playing for Al Khalidiya SC and the Bahrain national football team, and appeared for the team in the 2007, 2011 and 2015 AFC Asian Cup finals. He is famous for scoring a dramatic injury time goal in the match against Saudi Arabia on 9 September 2009 that sent Bahrain into the 2010 World Cup Qualification final play-off round against New Zealand.

Career 
He is a senior member of the squad since 2005, played a significant role on helping Bahrain to reach two consecutive FIFA World Cup playoffs, but failed in both playoffs. After 2017, he decided to retire from the team following the national side's deterioration of performances, but later revoked the decision to return to the senior side in 2019 for the 2019 WAFF Championship.

International goals 
Scores and results list Bahrain's goal tally first.

See also
 List of men's footballers with 100 or more international caps

References

External links 

1986 births
Living people
Bahraini footballers
Bahrain international footballers
Bahraini expatriate footballers
Expatriate footballers in Kuwait
Expatriate footballers in Oman
Association football forwards
2007 AFC Asian Cup players
2011 AFC Asian Cup players
2015 AFC Asian Cup players
Bahraini expatriate sportspeople in Kuwait
Al-Arabi SC (Kuwait) players
Al-Nasr SC (Salalah) players
Al-Muharraq SC players
Al Salmiya SC players
Al Ahli SC (Doha) players
Al-Nahda Club (Saudi Arabia) players
Al Hala SC players
Bahraini expatriate sportspeople in Oman
Saudi Professional League players
Footballers at the 2006 Asian Games
Qatari Second Division players
FIFA Century Club
Bahraini Premier League players
Asian Games competitors for Bahrain
Bahraini expatriate sportspeople in Saudi Arabia
Expatriate footballers in Saudi Arabia
People from Muharraq
Kuwait Premier League players